The Pillars of the Earth is an eight-part 2010 TV miniseries, adapted from Ken Follett's 1989 novel of the same name. It debuted in the U.S. on Starz and in Canada on The Movie Network/Movie Central on July 23, 2010. Its UK premiere was on Channel 4 in October 2010 at 9pm. In 2011, the series was nominated for 3 Golden Globes, including Best Mini-Series or Motion Picture Made for Television, Ian McShane for Best Actor and Hayley Atwell for Best Actress at the 68th Annual Golden Globe Awards.

Overview
Like the novel on which it is based, the miniseries centres on the construction of a cathedral in the fictional town of Kingsbridge during a tumultuous period of English history known as The Anarchy in the 12th century.

Differences from the novel
A number of character changes were made for the series. For example, Waleran is older and Remigius is younger in the series than the novel. Similarly the actors playing Alfred, Jack, Richard, and Aliena are initially older than those portrayed in the novel. Also, the characters of Henry of Blois, Andrew Sacrist, Milius the kitchener, and Thomas Becket are not introduced in the series. The incestuous fixation of Regan to her son William is not introduced in the novel. The story of young Philip and Francis' rescue by Abbot Peter after the death of their parents during a war in Wales is omitted and Prior James is said to be the one who brought the boy Philip to the priory.  Further, the thief character who attacks Martha and steals their pig is merged to become the monk Johnny Eightpence. Jack and Aliena only have one child in the series.

Character events were also modified on occasion. Shareburg, Ellen's lover and the father of Jack, is not hanged but burnt at the stake, and does not sing the minstrel song seen in the novel. In the TV series, Ellen is not pregnant at that time (but holds a baby) and does not use a cockerel during her curse. The romantic tryst between Ellen and Tom in the woods after the death of Agnes as per the novel does not occur, rather they become closer after Ellen states that Jack needs a master builder to whom to apprentice. Similarly, Alfred is also not seen physically bullying Martha or Jack in the series. The execution scene of Bartholomew (and Aliena's appeal to Stephen for mercy, and Stephen's offer of a knighthood to Richard) in episode 3 does not occur in the novel, where he simply languishes and dies alone in prison. Also, Jack does not duel Walter for the rights to the quarry as shown in episode 3, nor have his hand broken. In the novel, Percy Hamleigh dies of unknown causes, whereas in episode 4, he is bled to death by his ambitious wife Regan. The poisoning of Jack in episode 6 was added by the series.

Several plot changes also happened. For example, the body of the saint in the burning church is not saved as per the novel, but the body-less skull is lost in the inferno. Also, in the series, Tom tells Jack to sculpt a stone statue of St. Adolphus. In the novel Henry of Blois (and not Stephen) visits the cathedral work-site, and in episode 4, it is Jack (and not Richard as per the novel) who accompanies Philip to Lincoln. Episode 5's lake scene where Aliena swims and later rescues Alfred from drowning is not seen in the novel. The tales of Jack and Aliena travelling in Spain are not shown in episode 7. Further, rather than being given a weeping statue in Toledo as detailed in the novel, Jack carves one himself from wood and a rejected stone from St. Denis. Philip's loss of the priorship to Remegius, Cuthbert's assassination attempt on Jack, and William murdering Regan are also creations seen in episode 7 of the series.

Episode 8
The ending of the series is completely different from the novel.

In the novel, William becomes Sheriff when he is old. He then tries to arrest Richard for murdering Alfred. Richard then claims sanctuary in the cathedral and then decides to leave on a crusade, and Aliena takes over the Earldom. Waleran becomes disgraced for his part in the murder of Thomas Becket and tells Jack who his father was. William hangs for his part in the murder of Becket. Jonathan becomes Prior of Kingsbridge and Philip becomes Bishop.

In the series, William becomes Sheriff almost immediately after he loses the Earldom. Waleran makes Alfred cut himself with a knife and blame it on Jack to get him arrested. Unknown to Alfred, the knife was poisoned so that Jack could be charged for murder. William then successfully arrests Jack, and is put on a public trial. Waleran leads the trial, ultimately charging Jack guilty of murder and sentences him to hang. However, just in time, Jack's mother arrives at the trial, and talks about how Waleran was the man in charge of setting Jack's father up for murder. She then reveals that she has gotten hold of the letter that Jack's father was about to send to the King, and that it told how Jack's father saw Waleran and the Hamleighs being present on the White Ship and murdering the young prince and his wife before sailing away safely. Extremely frustrated, William tries to attack Aliena, but is held back by the crowd. Jack's mother unties the noose from Jack's neck and the crowd put William Hamleigh there instead, where he is then hanged. Meanwhile, Waleran escapes and tries to run away, but the crowd corners him into the cathedral. Trying in vain to escape via the roof, Waleran falls off the cathedral and dies. Philip remains Prior of Kingsbridge.

Cast

 Ian McShane as Waleran Bigod, Bishop of Kingsbridge, later Cardinal and Bishop of Kingsbridge
 Rufus Sewell as Tom Builder, 1st Head Builder of the Kingsbridge Cathedral
 Matthew Macfadyen as Prior Philip, Prior of Kingsbridge Priory and Cathedral Church and later Philip, Bishop of Kingsbridge
 Eddie Redmayne as Jack Jackson, 3rd Head Builder of the Kingsbridge Cathedral
 Hayley Atwell as Lady Aliena, daughter to Earl Bartholomew, merchant of Kingsbridge
 Sarah Parish as Regan Hamleigh
 Natalia Wörner as Ellen, a former nun, dissident, and Jack Jackson's mother
 Anatole Taubman as Remigius, Sub-Prior of Kingsbridge
 John Pielmeier as Cuthbert, a Brother in the Kingsbridge Priory
 Robert Bathurst as Percy Hamleigh
 Clive Wood as King Henry I
 Sam Claflin as Richard, Earl of Shiring
 Liam Garrigan as Alfred, 2nd Head Builder of the Cathedral
 David Oakes as William Hamleigh, sometime Earl of Shiring
 Götz Otto as Walter, William's valet and henchman
 Tony Curran as King Stephen, King of England
 Donald Sutherland as Bartholomew, Earl of Shiring, supporter of Empress Maud
 Alison Pill as Empress Maude, Queen of England and Dowager Holy Roman Empress
 Gordon Pinsent as Archbishop of Canterbury

Additional cast
In alphabetical order
 Féodor Atkine as Abbot Suger
 David Bark-Jones as Francis
 Skye Bennett as Martha young
 Freddie Boath as Henry 15 years old
 Douglas Booth as Eustace 15 years old
Matt Devere as Gloucester
 Kate Dickie as Agnes
 Ken Follett as Merchant
Jody Halse as Johnny Eightpence
Emily Holt as Martha older
Sidney Johnston as Jonathan 4–5 years old
 Skye Lourie as Elizabeth
Michael A. Mehlmann as Prior James
Mark Phelan as Otto
Tibor Pintér as Shareburg
Kevin Rees as Jonathan 30 years old
Brooke Dean as Maud - 6 years old

Production

The miniseries took about a year to produce, at a cost of US$40 million. The project was funded by the German production company Tandem Communications, the Canadian film company Muse Entertainment Enterprises, and the UK and U.S. based Scott Free Productions. It was filmed in Austria and Hungary in 2009. The final aerial shot is of modern-day Salisbury with a CGI cathedral combining elements of Salisbury Cathedral and Wells Cathedral, to represent the complete fictional Kingsbridge Cathedral, which were the two cathedrals which inspired Follett during the writing of the novel. The series was followed by an adaptation of the sequel World Without End in 2012.

Historical accuracy
Several historical timelines of The Anarchy were modified or invented for the series, and in the view of one reviewer "great liberties are taken with the actual history". For example, the birth of Henry II and the death of his grandfather Henry I timelines are shortened in episode 1, given that young Henry was born in March 1133, and the older Henry died in December 1135. Further, geographically, Henry II was living in Maine when Henry I fell ill in Normandy while hunting. Similarly in episode 4, both King Stephen and Robert of Gloucester are captured at the Battle of Lincoln. While it is accurate that Stephen was captured in Lincoln in early February 1141 (and later imprisoned in Bristol), Gloucester was not captured until more than seven months later in the Rout of Winchester in mid-September.

Similarly, other historical characters were given premature deaths. For example, the nameless Archbishop of Canterbury seen in episodes 1-6 (historically Theobald of Bec) was not murdered, but served throughout the period of The Anarchy from 1138 to 1161, and he died after a long illness. Similarly Maud's illegitimate half-brother, Robert of Gloucester, did not die nor was beheaded on the battlefield as shown in episode 7. Rather he died in 1147 at Bristol Castle, where he had previously imprisoned King Stephen. Finally, while Eustace does precede his father Stephen in death, it was not at the hands of his cousin Henry in battle as shown in episode 8, but probably due to a fit or seizure.

Broadcast 
The premiere was simulcast on both Starz and Encore. On Starz 423,000 people watched, and on Encore 267,000 people watched, for a total of 690,000 total viewers. In the Starz broadcast, episodes 1 and 2, as a series premiere, and episodes 7 and 8, as a series finale, were broadcast together as a single episode. In the 2011 broadcast by the Canadian Broadcasting Corporation, the series was re-cut into nine episodes. In December 2012, the series was shown in Australia by the Australian Broadcasting Corporation in four parts at weekly intervals, combining pairs of episodes each with a single introduction.

Episodes

Reception
The review aggregation website Rotten Tomatoes gave the series a 77% approval rating based on 30 reviews, with an average rating of 5.92/10. The site's critical consensus reads: "With its talented cast and strong production values, Pillars of the Earth is the kind of satisfying, eventful miniseries that is rarely seen these days."

Awards and nominations

See also
 The Pillars of the Earth (video game)
 List of historical drama films

References

External links 

 
 

2010 Canadian television series debuts
2010 Canadian television series endings
2010s Canadian television miniseries
2010s German television miniseries
Sat.1 original programming
Television shows based on British novels
Television series set in the Middle Ages
Films set in the 12th century
Films set in England
Films shot in Hungary
Starz original programming
Television series by Tandem Productions
Television series by Muse Entertainment
Cathedrals in fiction
Henry I of England
Cultural depictions of Empress Matilda
Henry II of England
Adaptations of works by Ken Follett
Stephen, King of England
Gemini and Canadian Screen Award for Best Television Film or Miniseries winners
Eustace IV, Count of Boulogne